Joseph Brown may refer to:

Arts and entertainment
Victor Millan (Joseph Brown, 1920–2009), actor and theater professor known as 
Joe Brown (sculptor) (Joseph Brown, 1909–1985), American sculptor
Joseph Epes Brown (1920–2000), author of the book The Sacred Pipe
Joe E. Brown (Joseph Evans Brown, 1891–1973), American actor
Joseph Brown (Coronation Street), a fictional character from the British soap opera

Government and politics
Joseph Brown (Missouri politician) (1823–1899), mayor of Alton and St. Louis, Missouri
Joseph R. Brown (1805–1870), U.S. politician and Minnesota pioneer
Joseph E. Brown (1821–1894), U.S. Senator and Governor of Georgia
Joseph Tilley Brown (1844–1925), member of the Australian Parliament, 1906–1910
Joseph Edgar Brown (1880–1939), U.S. Representative from Tennessee
Joseph Mackey Brown (1851–1932), Governor of Georgia
Joseph O. Brown (1848–1903), mayor of Pittsburgh
Joseph Stanley Brown (1858–1941), private secretary to U.S. President James A. Garfield
Joseph A. Brown (1903–1963), Michigan state senator
Joseph D. Brown (born 1970), United States Attorney in Texas
Joseph N. Brown (1849–1922), member of the Mississippi Senate

Other people
Joseph Brown (shipbuilder), builder of the USS Tuscumbia
Joseph Brown (coach), Eastern Illinois University coach
Joseph C. Brown (died 1849), surveyor of the Louisiana Purchase 
Joseph Brown (astronomer) (1733–1785), United States industrialist and astronomer
Joseph W. Brown (1793–1880), U.S. Army general and co-founder of the town of Tecumseh, Michigan
Joseph Brown (cricketer) (1872–1915), English cricketer
Joseph Brown (bishop) (1796–1880), Roman Catholic bishop in Wales
Joseph Brown (engraver) (1809–1887), English engraver
Joseph "Black Joe" Brown (1750–1834), American Revolutionary War veteran

See also
Joe Brown (disambiguation)
Joseph Browne (disambiguation)
James Joseph Brown (1854–1922), American mining engineer